The Taiwanese ambassador in Castries is the official representative of the Government in Taipei to the Government of Saint Lucia. There was a representative of the Government in Beijing to the Government of Saint Lucia between 1997 and 2007 (see List of ambassadors of China to Saint Lucia).

List of representatives

References 

Saint Lucia
China